Jorge Caraballo may refer to:

 Jorge Caraballo (football), football player
 Jorge Caraballo (volleyball), Cuban volleyball player